The Minister for Defence is a senior minister in the Government of Ireland and leads the Department of Defence. The current Minister for Defence is Micheál Martin, TD. He is also Minister for Foreign Affairs.

The department is responsible for the Irish Defence Forces. The Ministers and Secretaries Acts 1924 assigned the minister the additional title of Commander-in-Chief as the Chairman of the Council of Defence. The Defence Act 1954 removed this title, as a result of the reconstitution of the Council of Defence. The President of Ireland, a largely ceremonial role, is considered the Supreme Commander of the Defence Forces. In practice, the Minister acts on the President's behalf and reports to the Irish Government. The Minister for Defence is advised by the Council of Defence on the business of the Department of Defence.

The Minister is assisted by the Minister of State at the Department of Defence, Peter Burke, TD.

Ministers for Defence since 1919

Notes

See also
Chief of Staff of the Defence Forces (Ireland)
Minister of State at the Department of Defence
Director of Military Intelligence (Ireland)

References

External links
Department of Defence

 
Ministers
Government ministers of the Republic of Ireland
Lists of government ministers of Ireland
Ireland, Defence
Ireland